Ninì Tirabusciò: la donna che inventò la mossa (Ninì Tirabusciò: the woman who invented "the move") is a 1970 Italian comedy film directed by Marcello Fondato. It was entered into the 21st Berlin International Film Festival.

Cast
 Monica Vitti as Maria Sarti aka Ninì Tirabusciò
 Gastone Moschin as Mariotti - Police deputy
 Carlo Giuffrè as Antonio, the musician
 Claude Rich as Paolo di Sergeno
 Sylva Koscina as The Baroness of Valdarno
 Peppino De Filippo as Giudge
 Ennio Balbo as General
 Salvo Randone as Baby Marini
 Nino Taranto as Ciccio, the illusionist
 Lino Banfi as Nicola Maldacea
 Pierre Clémenti as Francesco, the futurist poet
 Angela Luce as the Singer

References

External links

1970 films
Italian comedy films
1970s Italian-language films
1970 comedy films
Films directed by Marcello Fondato
Films scored by Carlo Rustichelli
Films set in Rome
Films set in Naples
Films set in Turin
1970s Italian films